All India Institute of Medical Sciences, Nagpur (AIIMS Nagpur)  is a medical research public higher education institute located at the Multi-modal International Cargo Hub and Airport at Nagpur (MIHAN), Nagpur, Maharashtra, India. It is one of the four "Phase-IV" All India Institutes of Medical Sciences (AIIMS) announced in July 2014.

History

Construction work on the permanent campus started in September 2017. Meanwhile, AIIMS Nagpur has commenced the academic session 2018-19 from temporary campus at Government Medical College and Hospital, Nagpur.

See also
 Education in India
 List of medical colleges in India

References

External links 
 

Universities and colleges in Nagpur
Nagpur
Medical colleges in Maharashtra
Educational institutions established in 2018
2018 establishments in Maharashtra